Hugh Ward (born 9 March 1970) was a Scottish footballer who played for Dumbarton, Clydebank and East Stirling.

References

1970 births
Living people
Scottish footballers
Dumbarton F.C. players
Clydebank F.C. (1965) players
East Stirlingshire F.C. players
Scottish Football League players
Sportspeople from Dumbarton
Footballers from West Dunbartonshire
Association football forwards